Cyprian Davis, O.S.B. (born Clarence John Davis; September 9, 1930 – May 18, 2015) was an African-American Catholic monk, priest, and historian at St. Meinrad Archabbey in Indiana. He is known for his work on the history of Black Catholicism.

Biography 
Davis was born in Washington, D.C. on September 9, 1930. He converted to Catholicism in his teenage years and became interested in joining the priesthood as well as becoming a monk. Though many monastic communities (and most Catholic religious institutes) did not accept African Americans at the time, after high school Davis joined the seminary of St. Meinrad Archabbey (1949–1956). He became a novice on July 31, 1950, took the monastic name Cyprian on August 1, 1951, and was ordained a priest on May 3, 1956. He was the first African American to join that monastic community.

Davis received a Licentiate of Sacred Theology from the Catholic University of America (1957), before going to the Catholic University of Louvain, Belgium to study Church history, obtaining his doctorate from Louvain, in 1963. While there, Davis focused his work on the Church during the Middle Ages to avoid American Church history and concerns of race and slavery. Upon his first return from Belgium in 1963, he taught church history at Saint Meinrad Seminary, and eventually became the school's first professor emeritus in 2012.

Having returned to the US in the midst of the civil rights movement, Davis attended the August 1963 March on Washington and heard Martin Luther King Jr. deliver his "I Have a Dream" speech. He would later march with Mary Antona Ebo and others in the Selma to Montgomery marches.

As a black Catholic professor, he began to be invited to speak in black parishes and was constantly asked about the place of African Americans in the Catholic church. He was involved in writing two pastoral letters on race, "Brothers and Sisters to Us" (1979) and "What We Have Seen and Heard" (1984), and later received a grant from the Lilly Endowment to the study the black Catholic church, resulting in the publication of his award-winning The History of Black Catholics in the United States (1990)

Davis died on May 18, 2015 in Memorial Hospital in Jasper, Indiana, at age 84.

Works

References 

1930 births
2015 deaths
African-American historians
African-American Roman Catholic priests
Religious studies scholars
American Benedictines
20th-century American Roman Catholic theologians
21st-century American Roman Catholic theologians
20th-century African-American writers
21st-century African-American writers
African-American Catholic consecrated religious